DIH or dih may refer to:

 Defense Intelligence Headquarters, the official signals intelligence agency of the Japanese government
 Diamond Hill station (station code DIH), a Hong Kong MTR railway station
 Dih, Raebareli, a village in Uttar Pradesh, India
 Dih, Turkey, the Kurdish name for the city of Eruh
 Dihedral group (dih)
 Kumeyaay language (ISO 639 code: dih)
 Digital intangible heritage
 Heimwehfluhbahn (German: Drahtseilbahn Interlaken–Heimwehfluh), a funicular railway in Switzerland